Alessandro Alvisi (12 February 1887 – 9 May 1951) was an Italian horse rider who competed in the 1920 Summer Olympics and in the 1924 Summer Olympics. In 1920 he and his horse Raggio di Sole won the bronze medal in the team jumping event. Four years later he and his horse Capiligio won the bronze medal in the team eventing after finishing twelfth in the individual eventing competition.

References

External links
 
 

1887 births
1951 deaths
Italian event riders
Italian show jumping riders
Olympic equestrians of Italy
Italian male equestrians
Equestrians at the 1920 Summer Olympics
Equestrians at the 1924 Summer Olympics
Olympic bronze medalists for Italy
Olympic medalists in equestrian
Medalists at the 1924 Summer Olympics
Medalists at the 1920 Summer Olympics